Le Mesnil-Raoult is a former commune in the Manche department in Normandy in north-western France. On 1 January 2016, it was merged into the commune of Condé-sur-Vire.

See also
Communes of the Manche department

References 

Mesnilraoult